Randolpho Francisco Castillo (December 18, 1950 – March 26, 2002) was an American musician. He was Ozzy Osbourne's drummer during the mid-1980s to the early 1990s, and later as drummer for Mötley Crüe, from 1999 to his death in 2002.

Early life
Castillo was born in Albuquerque, New Mexico. He was inspired to take up the drums after seeing The Beatles perform on The Ed Sullivan Show in 1964.

Randy's first rock band in Albuquerque was a hard rock cover band, "The Wumblies," which later moved to Denver, Colorado before breaking up in 1980. Randy Castillo was a mixed-race Apache Native American.

Career
In 1984, Castillo was hired to play drums for Lita Ford and was featured on her Dancin' on the Edge album. Ford introduced Castillo to her boyfriend, Mötley Crüe bassist Nikki Sixx, and Nikki’s bandmate Tommy Lee. Shortly after the “Dancin’ on the Edge” tour, Lee called Castillo from a party he was at with Ozzy Osbourne and told him Ozzy was looking for a new drummer. Despite being unable to audition right away due to a broken leg he suffered while skiing, Castillo was hired by Osbourne a couple months later and ended up staying with the Ozzy Osbourne band for ten years, recording five albums with Ozzy during that time: The Ultimate Sin (1986), No Rest for the Wicked (1988), Just Say Ozzy (1990), No More Tears (1991), and a double-disc live album, Live & Loud (1993).

After recording Ozzy's live album in 1993, he joined the short-lived Bone Angels, followed by Red Square Black. Castillo also briefly returned to Osbourne's band in 1995 for a tour, and played drums on several tribute albums during this time.  He played with Ronnie James Dio on a cover of Alice Cooper's "Welcome To My Nightmare" on the Alice Cooper tribute album "Welcome To The Nightmare (An All Star Tribute To Alice Cooper) " and performed all drumming duties on a star-studded Def Leppard tribute album titled Leppardmania. The album featured John Corabi (Angora, The Scream, Mötley Crüe), Paul Shortino (Rough Cutt, Quiet Riot), Kevin DuBrow (Quiet Riot), Joe Leste (Bang Tango), and Jani Lane (Warrant, solo artist), among others. Guitar and bass duties were handled by Jerry Dixon and Erik Turner of Warrant, and Tracii Guns of L.A. Guns.

In 1999, after Lee had left Mötley Crüe, Sharon Osbourne called Castillo and suggested he join the band, which he did without audition. He'd previously briefly played with Vince Neil as a touring drummer for the Vince Neil Band, and was an old friend of the band. His only recording with the band, 2000's New Tattoo, was somewhat of a return to the classic Mötley Crüe sound. However, fan reaction was mixed and the album was not as successful as the band was hoping it would be. Still, there was excitement over the upcoming tour due to the revival in interest of many '80s hard rock acts, and the band geared up for their "Maximum Rock" tour with thrash metal legends Anthrax and Megadeth.

Death
Several weeks before Mötley Crüe was set to tour the New Tattoo album, joining Megadeth and Anthrax on the Maximum Rock Tour, Castillo became ill while performing with his mariachi side project Azul at the Cat Club in Hollywood. Immediately after the show Castillo took a cab to nearby Cedars Sinai Hospital where he collapsed as he was being admitted. The doctors discovered a duodenal ulcer that had ruptured his stomach and performed emergency surgery that saved Castillo’s life. With Castillo out of action, Hole drummer Samantha Maloney filled in for the tour. In October 2000, while taking time off from Mötley Crüe to recover from his surgery, he discovered a small lump on his jaw and a month later, after it had grown to roughly the size of a golf ball, he sought treatment and was diagnosed with squamous cell carcinoma, a common form of cancer that is not usually fatal if it is discovered early but can spread rapidly if left untreated. The cancer went into remission in mid-2001, and he was rumored to be rejoining Osbourne's solo band for that summer Ozzfest tour (along with Geezer Butler on bass), though these rumors were later revealed to be untrue.

Within a few months the cancer returned but this time in a more aggressive and lethal way, and a few days after returning to the doctors, Castillo died on March 26, 2002 aged 51. During the final weeks of his life, Castillo had been working with ex-Ozzy Osbourne and Alice in Chains bassist Mike Inez on a new band and was in the process of hiring a singer.

Discography

The Mud
Mud on Mudd  (1970 UNI Records)
Mud     (1971 UNI Records)

The Offenders
The Offenders (1980)

Lita Ford
Dancin' on the Edge (1984)

Ozzy Osbourne
The Ultimate Sin (1986)
No Rest for the Wicked (1988)
Just Say Ozzy (1990)
No More Tears (1991)
Live & Loud (1993)

Red Square Black
Red Square Black "EP" (1994)

Bret Michaels
A Letter From Death Row (1998) (On Song "I'd Die For You")

Mötley Crüe
New Tattoo (2000)

References

External links
Randy Castillo memorial site
Randy Castillo memorial site at the Wayback Machine
Randy Castillo Unofficial site

1950 births
2002 deaths
American heavy metal drummers
American heavy metal singers
American people of Native American descent
Burials in New Mexico
Deaths from cancer in California
Deaths from squamous cell carcinoma of skin
Musicians from Albuquerque, New Mexico
Mötley Crüe members
Vince Neil Band members
The Ozzy Osbourne Band members
20th-century American drummers
American male drummers
20th-century American male singers
20th-century American singers